Giovanni Fanello (born 21 February 1939 in Pizzo) is an Italian former footballer who played as a forward.

Career 
Fanello began playing football with local side Polisportiva Pizzo. He turned professional with U.S. Catanzaro, and was the leading goalscorer of Serie C as he helped the club gain promotion to Serie B during the 1958–59 season. After playing for Italy at the 1960 Summer Olympics, Fanello signed with Serie A side A.C. Milan. However, his opportunities with the first team were limited, and he was loaned to U.S. Alessandria. He would appear for several other Italian clubs, including S.S.C. Napoli, and scored 17 goals in 80 Serie A appearances and 71 goals in 218 Serie B appearances. In 1973, he played abroad in the National Soccer League with Toronto Italia. He also served as a player-coach for Toronto Italia in 1973.

Honours

Club 
Catanzaro
 Italian Football Championship / Serie C1
 Winner: 1958–59

Napoli
 Italian Football Championship / Serie B
 Runner-up: 1961–62, 1964–65

Catania
 Coppa delle Alpi
 Finalist: 1963–64

Napoli
 Coppa Italia
 Winner: 1961–62

Individual 
Alessandria
 Italian Football Championship / Serie B
 Top goalscorer for the 1960–61 season - 26 goals in 38 games (Italian record)

References

External links 

1939 births
Living people
People from Pizzo, Calabria
Italian footballers
U.S. Catanzaro 1929 players
A.C. Milan players
U.S. Alessandria Calcio 1912 players
S.S.C. Napoli players
Toronto Italia players
Serie A players
Serie B players
Canadian National Soccer League players
Olympic footballers of Italy
Footballers at the 1960 Summer Olympics
Association football forwards
Canadian National Soccer League coaches
Italian expatriate sportspeople in Canada
Expatriate soccer players in Canada
Sportspeople from the Province of Vibo Valentia
Footballers from Calabria